The World Darts Federation recognise many darts tournaments each year including major titles such as the Lakeside World Professional Championship and the Winmau World Masters. Through 2007, the WDF had held four majors which constituted the Grand Slam, until the Topic International Darts League and Bavaria World Darts Trophy were cancelled in 2008 following the withdrawal of the Dutch broadcasters SBS 6, when it was announced that PDC players, including Raymond van Barneveld, Jelle Klaasen, and Michael van Gerwen would not be competing.

Tournaments
Tournaments listed below are recognised by the WDF and ranked accordingly to their point allocation system but are not organised or run by them they are staged by WDF member associations, councils federations and organisations. The only tournaments organised and operated by the WDF are the international Majors such as the WDF World Cup which is held every two years and the continental championships the  WDF internationals and the Welsh Open they operate similar to the International Tennis Federation who only stages Grand Slam events.

Tournament levels and points allocation

A player's WDF Ranking is based on the total points they have accrued over the previous 12-month period that run from December to December according to the tournament schedule  from the following 85 tournaments:
The five World Darts Federation Major tournaments. 
The thirteen World Darts Federation Category One tournaments.
The twenty six World Darts Federation  Category Two tournaments.
The thirty seven World Darts Federation  Category Three tournaments.
The four Major international events WDF World Cup (singles, pairs, team), WDF Americas Cup (singles, pairs, team), WDF Europe Cup(singles, pairs, team) and WDF Asia-Pacific Cup(singles, pairs, team).

Ranking method

Since the formation of the WDF rankings in 1974 the method used to calculate a player's ranking points has changed several times.
Notes: The WDF international tournaments have six categories for both men and women (singles, pairs and teams)

Current points distribution
Points are currently awarded as follows:

Majors

Category 1

Category 2

Category 3

Special category events

Major International events

Other international events
Six Nations Cup

Former events

Notes: As of 2016 category 4 events have ceased.

See also

 List of BDO ranked tournaments

References

External links
 WDF tournament categories and points allocations
 WDF Tournament Details 2015
 WDF tournament archives Dutch site
 BFI Database List of archives for darts on television
 IDPA website list current years winners, runner-up, semi-finalists and quarter-finalists

Darts tournaments